Niger has sent athletes to all Summer Olympic Games held since 1964 except for 1976 and 1980. Only twice has the country won an Olympic medal: Issaka Daborg, who won a bronze medal in light welterweight boxing in 1972, and Abdoul Razak Issoufou, who won a silver medal in men's +80 kg taekwondo in 2016. No athletes from Niger have competed in any Winter Olympic Games.

Medal tables

Medals by Summer Games

Medals by sport

List of medalists

See also
 List of flag bearers for Niger at the Olympics
 Niger at the Paralympics

External links